Tony Barrell or Anthony Barrell may refer to:
Tony Barrell (journalist), British journalist active since 1993
Tony Barrell (broadcaster) (1940–2011), English author and broadcaster who lived in Australia